The 2017–18 Hellenic Football League season was the 65th in the history of the Hellenic Football League, a football competition in England.

The constitution for Step 5 and Step 6 divisions for 2017–18 was announced on 26 May 2017. Following some adjustments, the constitution for the Hellenic League was ratified at the league's AGM on 2 July.

Premier Division

Premier Division featured 15 clubs which competed in the division last season, along with five new clubs:
 Abingdon United, promoted from Division One West
 Fairford Town, promoted from Division One West
 Wantage Town, relegated from the Southern League
 Windsor, transferred from the Combined Counties League
 Woodley United, promoted from Division One East

League table

Division One East

Division One East featured nine clubs which competed in the division last season, along with five new clubs:
 Henley Town, relegated from the Premier Division
 Milton United, transferred from Division One West
 Thame Rangers, promoted from Spartan South Midlands League Division Two
 Virginia Water, promoted from the Surrey Elite Intermediate League
 Wallingford Town, promoted from the North Berks League

League table

Division One West

Division One West featured eleven clubs which competed in the division last season, along with four new clubs:
 Ardley United, demoted from the Premier Division
 Headington Amateurs, transferred from Division One East
 Kidlington reserves, promoted from Division Two West
 Pewsey Vale, transferred from the Wessex League

League table

Division Two East

Division Two East featured 5 clubs which competed in the division last season, along with 7 new clubs:
 Abingdon Town
 Abingdon United development, transferred from Division Two West and changed name form Abingdon United reserves
 Chinnor reserves, from Oxfordshire Senior League
 London Rangers
 Long Crendon
 Thame Rangers development
 Virginia Water reserves

League table

Division Two West

Division Two West featured 7 clubs which competed in the division last season, along with 5 new clubs:
Bishop's Cleeve development   
Carterton, dropped from Premier Division
Cheltenham Saracens reserves
Clanfield reserves, rejoined the League
Newent Town, joined from the Gloucestershire Northern Senior League

League table

References

External links
 Official Site

2017–18
9